Anthem Lights is the second EP by the American Christian boy band Anthem Lights. It is the first EP released under the group's current name. In addition to notable mentions, Anthem Lights has received very positive reviews. "Can't Shut Up", the first track from Anthem Lights, peaked at No. 42 on Billboard's Christian Songs chart and at No. 27 on the CHR radio charts.

Track listing

Music videos 
 "Can't Shut Up"

Personnel 
 Chad Graham - vocals
 Caleb Grimm - vocals
 Kyle Kupecky - vocals
 Alan Powell - vocals

References 

2011 EPs
Christian music EPs
Anthem Lights albums